The periplasm is a concentrated gel-like matrix in the space between the inner cytoplasmic membrane and the bacterial outer membrane called the periplasmic space in gram-negative bacteria. Using cryo-electron microscopy it has been found that a much smaller periplasmic space is also present in gram-positive bacteria.

The periplasm may constitute up to 40% of the total cell volume of gram-negative bacteria, but is a much smaller percentage in gram-positive bacteria.  Several types of enzyme are present in the periplasm including alkaline phosphatases, cyclic phosphodiesterases, acid phosphatases and 5’-nucleotidases.

Although bacteria are conventionally divided into two main groups—gram-positive and gram-negative, based upon their Gram-stain retention property—this classification system is ambiguous as it can refer to three distinct aspects (staining result, cell-envelope organization, taxonomic group), which do not necessarily coalesce for some bacterial species. However, although Gram-staining response of bacteria is an empirical criterion, its basis lies in the marked differences in the ultrastructure and chemical composition of the two main kinds of bacteria. These bacteria are distinguished from each other based on the presence or absence of an outer lipid membrane, which is a more reliable and fundamental characteristic of the bacterial cells.

All gram-positive bacteria are bounded by a single unit lipid membrane; they generally contain a thick layer (20-80 nm) of peptidoglycan responsible for retaining the Gram-stain. A number of other bacteria which are bounded by a single membrane but stain gram-negative due to either lack of the peptidoglycan layer (viz., mycoplasmas) or their inability to retain the Gram-stain due to their cell wall composition, also show close relationship to the gram-positive bacteria. For the bacterial (prokaryotic) cells that are bounded by a single cell membrane the term "monoderm bacteria" or "monoderm prokaryotes" has been proposed. In contrast to gram-positive bacteria, all archetypical gram-negative bacteria are bounded by a cytoplasmic membrane as well as an outer cell membrane; they contain only a thin layer of peptidoglycan (2–3 nm) between these membranes. The presence of both inner and outer cell membranes forms and define the periplasmic space or periplasmic compartment. These bacterial cells with two membranes have been designated as diderm bacteria. The distinction between the monoderm and diderm prokaryotes is supported by conserved signature indels in a number of important proteins (for example, DnaK and GroEL).

In diderm bacteria, the periplasm contains a thin cell wall composed of peptidoglycan. In addition, it includes solutes such as ions and proteins, which are involved in wide variety of functions ranging from nutrient binding, transport, folding, degradation, substrate hydrolysis, to peptidoglycan synthesis, electron transport, and alteration of substances toxic to the cell (xenobiotic metabolism). Importantly, the periplasm is devoid of ATP.

References

Further reading
 D. White, The Physiology and Biochemistry of Prokaryotes, Oxford University Press, Oxford, 2000, pp. 22.

Cell anatomy
Bacteriology